This article lists the extreme points of New Zealand – the places that lie farther north, south, east or west than any other location in New Zealand.

State Highway 1 runs throughout the two main islands from Cape Reinga in the north to Bluff in the south. Cape Reinga is sometimes popularly thought to be the northernmost point of the North Island, but North Cape is further north, with Cape Reinga the northwesternmost point. Similarly, Bluff is sometimes thought to be the southernmost point of the South Island, but Slope Point in the Catlins is slightly further south than the Bluff (the promontory that gives the town its name).

Extreme points

New Zealand overall

 

The northernmost, southernmost, westernmost, easternmost, highest and lowest points:
 Northernmost point – Nugent Island, in the Kermadec Islands
 Southernmost point – Jacquemart Island (off the south coast of Campbell Island) in the Campbell Island group
 Westernmost point – Cape Lovitt, Auckland Islands
 Easternmost point – Forty-Fours / Motuhara, in the Chatham Islands, east of Chatham Island

(This excludes New Zealand's claims over lands in the Ross Dependency, and its administration of the Tokelau Islands.)

North Island

 Northernmost point – Surville Cliffs, North Cape
 Southernmost point – Cape Palliser
 Westernmost point – Cape Maria van Diemen
 Easternmost point – East Cape
 Highest point – Mount Ruapehu, 2797m above sea level
 Lowest point – Lagoon Farm/Parklands, Napier, 1m below sea level. Lowest man-made point is Martha Mine pit, Waihi, 15m below sea level.

South Island

 Northernmost point – Cape Farewell
 Southernmost point – Slope Point
 Westernmost point – West Cape
 Easternmost point – West Head
 Highest point – Aoraki / Mount Cook, 3724m above sea level
 Lowest point – Taieri Plains, 2m below sea level

Centres of population

Northernmost settlements
Te Hāpua in the far north of the North Island is the northernmost settlement, although there is a permanently staffed station on Raoul Island, much further north. Kaitaia is the northernmost urban area with at least 1000 people. New Zealand's northernmost city is Whangārei.

The northernmost settlement in the South Island is Pūponga, close to the foot of Farewell Spit. Tākaka is the northernmost South Island urban area with at least 1000 people, and Nelson is the northernmost South Island city.

Southernmost settlements
The southernmost settlement in New Zealand is Oban, on Stewart Island, although there is a meteorological station on Campbell Island, though this is no longer permanently staffed since 1995. The southernmost town in New Zealand with a population over 1000 is Bluff. New Zealand's southernmost city is Invercargill - also its westernmost city. While New Zealand has a permanently staffed base at Scott Base in Ross Dependency, this area is not considered part of New Zealand.

The southernmost settlement in the North Island is Ngawi, near Cape Palliser. Wellington is the southernmost North Island urban area with population over 1000 and the North Island's southernmost city.

Easternmost settlements
The settlement of Waitangi on Chatham Island is New Zealand's easternmost settlement. In New Zealand's main chain, the easternmost settlement of any note is Tikitiki. The town of Ruatoria is New Zealand's easternmost town. New Zealand's easternmost city, and urban area with a population over 1000, is Gisborne.

In the South Island, Ward is the easternmost settlement of significance, Picton is the easternmost town with a population over 1000, and Nelson is the easternmost city.

Westernmost settlements
Small settlements at the head of Doubtful Sound and at Manapouri Hydro are the westernmost settlements in New Zealand. The westernmost settlement of significance is Manapouri, and the westernmost town with a population over 1000 is Te Anau. New Zealand's westernmost city is Invercargill, which is also its southernmost city.

In the North Island, Te Kao is the westernmost as well as the northernmost settlement of significance, Kaitaia is the westernmost town with a population over 1000, and New Plymouth is the westernmost city.

Most remote settlements 

Twizel (population ) is the country's most remote urban area with a population over 1,000.

Christchurch (population ) is the country's most remote city with a population over 30,000.

Closest point to Australia

See also 

Geography of New Zealand
Extreme points of Earth

References 

 
Geography of New Zealand
Extreme points of New Zealand